Walter Oswald (born 8 October 1955) is a German former professional footballer who played as a midfielder or defender.

Career statistics

References

External links
 

1955 births
Living people
Footballers from Linz
German footballers
Association football defenders
Association football midfielders
FC Gütersloh 2000 players
FC St. Pauli players
VfL Bochum players
VfL Bochum II players
Bundesliga players
2. Bundesliga players